Below is a list of squads used in the 1968 African Cup of Nations.

Group A

Algeria
Coach:  Lucien Leduc

Ethiopia
Coach:  Ferenc Szűcs

Ivory Coast
Coach:  Paul Gévaudan
|

Uganda
Coach: Robert Kiberu
|

Group B

Congo-Brazzaville
Coach:  Paul Ebondzibato

Congo-Kinshasa
Coach:  Ferenc Csanádi

Ghana
Coach:  Carlos Alberto Parreira

Senegal
Coach:Lamine Diack
|

 Toumani Diallo was injured shortly before the tournament, and perhaps didn't travel with the squad.

External links
1968 African Cup of Nations details - rsssf.com
Afcon 1968 - footballzz

Africa Cup of Nations squads
Squads